Arjan Singh Raikhy (born 20 October 2002) is an English footballer who currently plays as a midfielder for Premier League club Aston Villa. He is a product of the Aston Villa and West Bromwich Albion academies.

Career

Youth football
Raikhy played at West Bromwich Albion in his early teens, before switching to the nearby Aston Villa Academy.

Having played regularly for the under-18 side in the 2019–20 season, Raikhy featured for the Aston Villa U21 side in the EFL Trophy against Carlisle United, losing 3–1.

Having been a key player in Villa's Under-18 FA Youth Cup squad that season, on 24 May 2021, Raikhy was part of the side that defeated Liverpool U18 2–1 in the final.

Senior debut and loans
Raikhy was named in the Aston Villa starting line-up for his senior debut on 8 January 2021 in an FA Cup third round tie against Liverpool. On 7 July 2021, Raikhy was one of several young players who signed a new contract with Aston Villa.

On 20 August, Raikhy joined National League side Stockport County on a season-long loan. He made his National League debut in a 1–0 victory over Southend United. He made eight appearances for Stockport, including one man of the match award, before being recalled to Aston Villa on 3 January 2022.

On 24 January 2022, Raikhy went on loan to the National League once again, this time joining Grimsby Town until the end of the season. The following day, he made his Grimsby debut as a second-half substitute in a 1–0 defeat to Wrexham. On 5 June 2022, Raikhy played in the National League play-off final at the London Stadium as Grimsby beat Solihull Moors in extra time to secure promotion back to the Football League. This marked an unusual achievement, as both of the teams he had been at loan to in that National League season had been promoted.

Personal life
Raikhy is from a British Punjabi Sikh family, he was born in Wolverhampton and attended school in Telford.

Career statistics

Club

Honours 
Aston Villa U18
FA Youth Cup: 2020–21
Grimsby Town

 National League play-offs: 2022

References

2002 births
Association football midfielders
Aston Villa F.C. players
British Asian footballers
British sportspeople of Indian descent
English footballers
English people of Punjabi descent
Grimsby Town F.C. players
Living people
National League (English football) players
Stockport County F.C. players